The 2015 San Benedetto Tennis Cup is a professional tennis tournaments played on clay courts. It is the 11th edition of the tournament which is part of the 2015 ATP Challenger Tour, offering a total of €64,000+H in prize money. The event takes place in San Benedetto del Tronto, Italy, from 11 to 20 July 2015, including two days of qualifying competition.

Singles entrants

Seeds 

 1 Rankings as of 29 June 2015.

Other entrants 
The following players received wildcards into the singles main draw:
  Edoardo Eremin
  Alessandro Giannessi
  Daniel Gimeno-Traver
  Stefano Napolitano

The following players entered as an alternate into the singles main draw:
  Federico Gaio

The following players received entry from the qualifying draw:
  Toni Androić
  Salvatore Caruso
  Lorenzo Giustino
  Michael Linzer

Doubles main draw entrants

Seeds

1 Rankings as of 29 June 2015.

Champions

Singles 

 Albert Ramos-Viñolas def.  Alessandro Giannessi, 6-2, 6-4.

Doubles 

  Dino Marcan /  Antonio Šančić def.  César Ramírez /  Miguel Ángel Reyes-Varela, 6-3, 6-7(10-12), [12-10]

References 
 Main Draws

External links 
  

2015 ATP Challenger Tour
2015
2015 in Italian tennis